The year 2018 is the 2nd year in the history of the World Lethwei Championship, a Lethwei promotion based in Myanmar.

List of events

WLC 4: Bareknuckle-King 

WLC 4: Bareknuckle-King was a Lethwei event held on February 17, 2018  Wunna Theikdi Indoor Stadium in Myanmar's capital, Naypitaw.

Background 
This event marked the first title defence of middleweight Lethwei world champion Too Too. For the occasion, he faced Ukraine's Vasyl Sorokin, who was one of the fastest rising stars in the world of kickboxing. Sorokin had already been in more than 20 major fights and had recently scored a victory over Thai superstar Sudsakorn Sor Klinmee to earn him the title shot. After 5 rounds, Too Too won by unanimous decision over Sorokin and retained his title.

Fight Card

WLC 5: Knockout War 

WLC 5: Knockout War was a Lethwei event held on June 2, 2018 in Wunna Theikdi Indoor Stadium in Naypitaw, Myanmar.

Background 
Artur Saladiak and Saw Ba Oo contested the main event for the Light Middleweight World LethweiChampionship. Artur Saladiak defeated Saw Ba Oo by knockout to become the first Light Middleweight WLC Champion. Artur Saladiak is Britain's K-1 and Muay Thai champion, with a record of 16 wins, 5 losses and 1 draw.  He has been in the Lethwei ring three times, twice with Myanmar's Soe Lin Oo, and once with Alex Bublea from Romania. Saladiak showed impressive Lethwei skills in these fights, grabbing a chance to challenge the WLC's light middleweight world title. Taungkalay Lethwei Club's tough warrior Saw Ba Oo, 28, is one of the toughest Lethwei fighters in Myanmar, with 18 wins, 20 draws and 5 losses. The winner will become the WLC's world Lethwei champion in the light middleweight category. Saw Ba Oo's teammate Saw Darwait will go up against Kyaw Zin Latt from the Nine Thaton Lethwei Club for WLC's light welterweight title.

Fight Card

WLC 6: Heartless Tigers 

WLC 6: Heartless Tigers was a Lethwei event held on September 29, 2018 at the Thuwunna Stadium in Yangon, Myanmar.

Background 
This marked WLC's return in Yangon for the first time in 2018, after two events in Myanmar's capital. The event saw the debut of Kun Khmer star Roeung Sophorn who faced off against Myanmar's knockout artist Yan Naing Tun. With a record of 141 wins and 17 losses, the WLC signed Cambodian Sophorn in an attempt to bring the attention of millions of fans in his home country . Pich Mtes Khmang was also in action in a lightweight bout against Mite Yine. In the main event, Lethwei superstar Soe Lin Oo made his WLC return against Zhao Wen Wen of China. Soe Lin Oo defeated Zhao Wen Wen by knockout in the second round.

Fight Card

See also
2018 in ILFJ

References

World Lethwei Championship events
2018 in Lethwei
2018 in kickboxing
2018 in Burmese sport